Caledonia Together is a political party in New Caledonia. The party was established on 14 October 2008 as a split from Future Together led by Philippe Gomès. The party is centrist and opposed to independence.

Future Together, a centrist party founded in 2004, split in 2008. The split started in the 2007 legislative election, when Gomès ran in New Caledonia's 1st constituency although Didier Leroux was supposed to run. Though both ran, and both polled 14%, respectively third and fourth, leaving the RPCR candidate Gaël Yanno against the candidate of the nationalist Kanak and Socialist National Liberation Front (FLINKS), which Yanno easily defeated. Martin was also defeated running the New Caledonia's 2nd constituency. Poor results in the 2008 local elections, including the capital, Nouméa, precipitated an open split between Gomès on one side and Martin-Leroux on the other. In 2008, Gomès and 12 Future Together Congressmen and women (including Thémereau) formed Caledonia Together.

In the 2014 provincial elections, the party placed first, winning 23.3% of the vote and 13 seats.

Electoral results

References 

Political parties in New Caledonia
Political parties established in 2008
Liberal parties in France